was a Japanese rock band active from 1997–2003. The trio was composed of vocalist , bassist/guitarist , and drummer . Like other Japanese bands which emerged in the late 1990s (including Clammbon and Hermann H. & the Pacemakers), Cymbals were strongly influenced by the British pop-rock sounds of the 1960s. Due to their eclectic blend of styles, the band is often linked to Shibuya-kei. Despite solid songwriting and album production, they never scored a true "hit", which eventually resulted in the band's breakup in September 2003. They played a final 90-minute farewell concert at Shibuya O-East on January 20, 2004. The group's members remain musically active – Toki as a solo artist, Okii as a producer (for Toki and others), and Yano as a session drummer and producer.

Discography

nb: A=Album; S=Single

References

External links
 - official website
 - Cymbals's discography at Victor Entertainment
 - Okii Reiji's website
 - Interview with Okii Reiji on Meromero&More (at about 28:12)
 - Yano Hiroyasu's current information
 - Nippop article on Cymbals
 - Cymbals discography at Discogs

Japanese rock music groups
Shibuya-kei musicians